Ourapteryx sciticaudaria is a moth of the family Geometridae first described by Francis Walker in 1863. It is found in south-east Asia, including Taiwan, China, Thailand, India and Bhutan.

References

Moths described in 1863
Ourapterygini